Coral Discoverer is an expedition cruise ship operating in Australia and Oceania. She has previously been called Oceanic Princess and  Oceanic Discoverer and was renamed Coral Discoverer in June 2015. The ship was launched in 2005 by NQEA Shipbuilders in Cairns, Australia.

Operations 

The 72 passenger Coral Discoverer is homeported in Cairns, Tropical North Queensland and is one of three vessels in the Coral Expeditions fleet, operating alongside Coral Expeditions I and Coral Expeditions II.

Coral Discoverer has four passenger decks, containing 36 passenger cabins, an open seat dining room and an al fresco dining deck, lounge and lecture lounge, two cocktail bars and a sun deck. She is equipped with a range of excursion tenders including inflatable zodiacs, glass bottom boat, kayaks and the 'Xplorer' excursion tender.

The ship operates itineraries that include Australia's 'Top End' and Kimberley, Tasmania, Papua New Guinea, Melanesia, New Zealand, Indonesia and West Papua.

She starred in a 3 hour long SBS Slow TV Broadcast The Kimberley Cruise: Australia's Last Great Wilderness that aired on 13 January 2019.

References

Expedition cruising
Passenger ships of Australia
2005 ships